Oasis Day Spa is a New York City day spa founded in 1998 that provides services such as waxing, massage therapy, Swedish massage, facials, and prenatal massage. The company also has an offsite massage and pop-up massage program that services the New York metropolitan area and most major US cities. Oasis retails products on their website, including brands such as Dermalogica, Cosmedix, Maximus Clark and Perfect Pearl.

History
Oasis Day Spa was founded in 1998 by Bruce Schoenberg. Bruce spent over 20 years in the event marketing and trade show industry. 
When starting the business, Bruce noticed that many spas were only offering massage and skin care services. However, practice of spa-going dates back thousands of years to when people would visit “the waters” for healing. Bruce wanted Oasis to be a true “spa,” and thus decided to make water-based treatments a focal point of his business.

Opening just a year after Bliss (spa), Oasis has since expanded to two new locations, and currently employs over 100 people.

JetBlue
In December 2004, Oasis partnered with JetBlue and opened a location in their terminal at John F. Kennedy Airport. When JetBlue moved to their new location in Terminal 5, Bruce decided not to continue the relationship.

Oasis Westchester
On November 21, 2008, Bruce opened an Oasis location in the town of Dobbs Ferry, located in Westchester County, NY. The spa offers the same services as the New York City location, plus the addition of outdoor massages.

Awards
New York Magazine
Best Massage 2002
Westchester Magazine
Best New Day Spa 2009
Best Day Spa 2010
Best of the Decade 2000-2010 
Best Massage 2012
American Spa
Best Day Spa 2010

References

Companies based in New York City
Companies established in 1998